Alireza Marandi (born 1939) is an Iranian politician, physician, and professor of Pediatrics and Neonatology at the Shahid Beheshti University. He was also an associate professor at Wright State University before returning to Iran, during the Revolutionary days.

Marandi is a former two-term Minister of Health (and Medical Education) during the premiership of Mir Hossein Mousavi as well as the second-term presidency of Mr. H. Rafsanjani. During his nine years in office, medical education was integrated with health care delivery. In each of the 29 provinces, one University of Medical Sciences was established, thus making the country self-sufficient in health human resources. In addition to being Minister, Dr. Marandi also served as Deputy Minister and Advisory to the Minister.

Marandi is Chairman of the Iranian Society of Neonatologists; the Board of Directors of the Islamic Republic of Iran Breastfeeding Promotion Society; and the National Committee for the Reduction of Perinatal Mortality and Morbidity. He is also the laureate recipient of the United Nations Population Award (1999) and WHO's Eastern Mediterranean Region's Shousha Award (2000). He is currently a commissioner of the World Health Organization (WHO) Commission on Social Determinants of Health and a recognized expert on pediatric and neonatal health issues.

Of his major contributions, was a highly successful national vaccination program (which also included a program for terminating polio in Iran), the significant reduction of infant and child mortality rates, as well as organizing one of the most successful national birth control programs in the World.

Marandi was elected as an MP from the city of Tehran in the 2008 Iranian parliamentary elections in which around 1,700 candidates were barred from running by the Guardian Council vetting body, the Supervisory and Executive Election Boards.

The Supreme Leader of Iran is among the patients to whom he has attended in his private medical practice. He is the father of Mohammad Marandi.

References

Government ministers of Iran
Iranian pediatricians
Academic staff of Shahid Beheshti University of Medical Sciences
Living people
Wright State University faculty
1939 births
Popular Front of Islamic Revolution Forces politicians
Iranian Science and Culture Hall of Fame recipients in Medicine
Dr A.T. Shousha Foundation Prize and Fellowship laureates